Paul Moukila (6 June 1950 – May 1992), nicknamed Sayal, was a footballer who played as an attacking midfielder. A Congolese international, he was winner of the 1974 African Footballer of the Year award.

Career
Born in Souanké, Moukila began playing football for local side CARA Brazzaville. He played for the club from 1971 to 1975 and then from 1976 to 1978, after returning from a short spell abroad, at French club Strasbourg (1975–1976).

With the Congo national football team, Moukila won the African Cup of Nations in 1972. He was later voted African Footballer of the Year in 1974.

In 2006, he was selected by CAF as one of the best 200 African football players of the last 50 years. Moukila was voted the IFFHS Player of the Century for the Republic of the Congo in 2000.

Personal life
Moukila died in Meaux, France, from a bout of malaria on 23 May 1992.

His son Noël is also a former professional footballer and made two appearances for the Congo national team in 2007.

References

External links

Profile at Racingstub.com
Article at rfi  

1950 births
1992 deaths
People from Sangha Department (Republic of the Congo)
Association football midfielders
Africa Cup of Nations-winning players
Republic of the Congo footballers
Republic of the Congo expatriate footballers
Republic of the Congo international footballers
1972 African Cup of Nations players
1974 African Cup of Nations players
1978 African Cup of Nations players
CARA Brazzaville players
RC Strasbourg Alsace players
Ligue 1 players
Expatriate footballers in France
Republic of the Congo expatriate sportspeople in France
African Footballer of the Year winners
USM Malakoff (football) players
RCP Fontainebleau players